Adam Biddle is an English cinematographer, and the brother of late cinematographer Adrian Biddle.

Adam Biddle was Director of Photography on the films Crank and The Gnostic. In addition, he often served in direct roles on the many projects his brother Adrian helped create, including V for Vendetta, An American Haunting, 
Bridget Jones: The Edge of Reason, The World Is Not Enough, The Mummy, The Parent Trap, FairyTale: A True Story, Event Horizon, 101 Dalmatians, White Squall, Braveheart, Interview with the Vampire, Son of the Pink Panther, 1492: Conquest of Paradise, and The Power of One.

Biddle also has been cinematographer on Team Extreme They Would Love You in France, The Grimm Cycle, and Round About Five

External links

English cinematographers
Year of birth missing (living people)
Living people